Variation or Variations may refer to:

Science and mathematics 
 Variation (astronomy), any perturbation of the mean motion or orbit of a planet or satellite, particularly of the moon
 Genetic variation, the difference in DNA among individuals or the differences between populations
 Human genetic variation, genetic differences in and among populations of humans
 Magnetic variation, difference between magnetic north and true north, measured as an angle
 p-variation in mathematical analysis, a family of seminorms of functions
 Coefficient of variation in probability theory and statistics, a standardized measure of dispersion of a probability distribution or frequency distribution
 Calculus of variations in mathematical analysis, a method of finding maxima and minima of functionals

Arts 
 Variation (ballet) or pas seul, solo dance or dance figure
 Variations (ballet), a 1966 ballet by choreographer George Balanchine
 Variations (film), a 1998 short film by Nathaniel Dorsky
 Variations (journal), a journal of literature published by Peter Lang

Music 
 Variation (music), a formal technique where material is altered during repetition
 Variations (Cage), a series of works by American avant-garde composer John Cage
 Variations (musical), 1982 Australian musical by Nick Enright and Terence Clarke
 Variations (Stravinsky), Igor Stravinsky's last orchestral composition written in 1963–64
Variation, album by Akina Nakamori
 Les Variations, a French rock group
 Variations (Andrew Lloyd Webber album), 1978
 Variations (Eddie Rabbitt album), 1978

Other uses 
 Variation (game), modifications made to a game by a community of players (as opposed to a central authority)
 Variation (game tree), a particular series of moves
 Variation (linguistics), a linguistic characteristic of languages
 Variation (horse), a British Thoroughbred

See also 
 
 Variability (disambiguation)
 Change (disambiguation)
 Variations on a Theme (disambiguation)
 Rate of change (disambiguation)
 Repetition (disambiguation)
 Variant (disambiguation)
 Calculus of variations, a field of mathematics which deals with functions of functions
 Genetic diversity, total number of genetic characteristics in the genetic makeup of a species
 Variance, expectation of deviation in probability theory or statistics